Arsène Bernard N'Nomo (born 6 August 1980) is a Cameroonian rugby union player. He plays as a prop.

N'Nomo played in his home country for Taureau Rugby Club of Yaoundé, from 1997/98 to 2002/03. He then moved to Stade Aurillacois, where he played for 2005/06, UA Gaillac (2006/07), Blagnac SCR (2008) and FC Auch Gers (2008/09). He plays for SU Agen, since 2009/10, where he won the Pro D2 Championship title, being promoted to the Top 14, where he still develops.

He plays for Cameroon since 2000.

External links
Bernard N'Nomo Player Statistics

1980 births
Living people
Cameroonian rugby union players
Rugby union props
Cameroonian expatriate rugby union players
Expatriate rugby union players in France
Cameroonian expatriates in France